is a Japanese naval officer who served as the Self Defense Fleet's Commander of the Japanese Maritime Self Defence Force (JMSDF) from 2015 to 2016. He is the 48th Commander of the Self-Defense Fleet, succeeding Eiichi Funada. In 2016, he was succeeded by Manki Yamashita.

Career
Born in Yamaguchi prefecture. In March 1981, he graduated from the 25th term (civil engineering) of the National Defense Academy, joined the Maritime Self-Defense Force.

In July 1995, he was promoted to 2nd class Kaisa.

In January 2000, he was promoted to 1st class Kaisa.

On 20 September 2001, Chief of Business Planning Group, Defense Division, Defense Department, Maritime Staff Office.

One 20 August 2003, Commander of the 6th Air Group.

On 28 July 2005, Chief of Personnel Planning Division, Personnel Education Department, Maritime Staff Office.

On 4 August 2006, he was promoted to Rear Admiral, Commander of the 2nd Fleet Air Group.

On 1 August 2008, General Manager, General Affairs Department, Maritime Staff Office.

On 7 December 2009, Inspector General of Defense Inspection Headquarters.

On 5 August 2011, Chief of Staff, Sasebo District General Manager.

On 4 December 2012, he was promoted to Fleet Air Wing, Commander of the Fleet Air Force.

On 28 March 2014, Deputy Chief of the Maritime Staff Office.

On 4 August 2015, he was appointed 48h Commander of the Self-Defense Fleet.

On 22 December 2016, he was retired from the Navy. After retiring, he became an advisor to Gibraltar Life Insurance Co., Ltd.

Awards
 
 2nd Defensive Memorial Cordon

 3rd Defensive Memorial Cordon

 10th Defensive Memorial Cordon

 11th Defensive Memorial Cordon

 18th Defensive Memorial Cordon

 19th Defensive Memorial Cordon

 20th Defensive Memorial Cordon

 21st Defensive Memorial Cordon

 26th Defensive Memorial Cordon

 27th Defensive Memorial Cordon

 31st Defensive Memorial Cordon

 32nd Defensive Memorial Cordon

 33rd Defensive Memorial Cordon

 40th Defensive Memorial Cordon

See also
Japanese military ranks

References

1958 births
People from Yamaguchi Prefecture
Military personnel from Yamaguchi Prefecture
Living people